Sympistis hathor is a moth of the family Noctuidae first described by James T. Troubridge in 2008. It is found in the US state of Oregon.

The wingspan is about 32 mm.

References

hathor
Moths described in 2008